Angel's Dance is a 1999 American-German black comedy crime film written and directed by David L. Corley and produced by David Bixler. The film stars James Belushi, Sheryl Lee and Kyle Chandler.

Premise

Tony wants to be a hitman for the Mafia, but first he has to learn from a master. Enter Stevie "California" Rossellini - cool, eats veggie dogs and quotes Nietzsche. Greco may not agree with Stevie's style, but he has to complete his training so he can go back and kill the Mafia's accountant, who is about to turn state's evidence. His final test: kill whoever is supposedly randomly picked out of the yellow pages. His target: Angelica "Angel" Chaste, a very disturbed woman. Tony falls for Angel and fails to kill her, so Stevie sets out to finish the job.

Cast
 James Belushi as Stevie 'The Rose' Rosellini
 Sheryl Lee as Angelica Chaste
 Kyle Chandler as Tony Greco
 Frank John Hughes as Nick
 Ned Bellamy as Police Detective
 Mark Carlton as Bob
 Mac Davis as Norman
 Jon Polito as Vinnie 'Uncle Vinnie'
 David Bickford as Accountant
 Timo Flloko as 'The Shank'

References

External links
 

1999 films
1999 action comedy films
1990s black comedy films
1990s crime comedy films
1999 independent films
American action comedy films
American black comedy films
American crime comedy films
American independent films
English-language German films
Films about contract killing
German crime comedy films
German black comedy films
German independent films
Films about the American Mafia
1990s English-language films
1990s American films
1990s German films